Climax is a community located at the end of the road traversing the Antelope Creek canyon, sitting below Grizzly Peak, in Jackson County, Oregon.

External links
  Article from the "Upper Rogue Independent"
 Burials in Climax Cemetery
 Getting the mail to Climax (see page 11)

Unincorporated communities in Jackson County, Oregon
Unincorporated communities in Oregon